Coptodera festiva is a species of ground beetle in the family Carabidae. It is found in North America, South America and the Caribbean.

References 

Harpalinae
Beetles described in 1825